Carmarthenshire was a parliamentary constituency in Wales which returned one Member of Parliament (MP)  to the House of Commons of the Parliament of the United Kingdom until its representation was increased to two members for the 1832 general election.

At the 1885 general election, it was divided into two new single-member seats: Carmarthenshire East and Carmarthenshire West.

History
For most of its history, the Carmarthenshire constituency was dominated by a small number of powerful families. Chief among these were the Rice family of Dynevor, who could claim descent from the medieval Lord Rhys of Deheubarth. They drew upon traditional loyalty and the connotations linked to the Dynevor name to maintain their status as the leading political family of the county and leaders of the Red or Tory faction.

In 1790 the influence of the Dynevor family was re-asserted when George Talbot Rice was elected unopposed. Four years later, he was elevated to the House of Lords and the family would not be in a position to represent the county again until 1820 when his yet unborn son would have came of age.
 
A celebrated contest took place in 1802 between James Hamlyn Williams and William Paxton. The contest was said to have cost Paxton a total of £15,000. This included  11,070 breakfasts, 36,901 dinners, 25,275 gallons of ale, 11,068 bottles of spirits, 8,879 bottles of porter, 460 of sherry, 509 of cider and gallons of milk punch. The contest became known as ‘Lecsiwn Fawr’ (the Great Election). Paxton was defeated and spent two years settling his debts.

In 1820, George Rice Trevor was elected MP for Carmarthenshire and held the seat until 1831, when he stood down over his opposition to reform.

Reformed elections
Following the Great Reform Act, the county was awarded a second seat. In 1832, Rice Trevor resumed his parliamentary career and served until 1852 when he was elevated to the House of Lords upon inheriting the title of Lord Dynevor. He was succeeded by David Jones of Pantglas, who served until 1868.

The second seat was held by supporters of the Whig party until John Jones of Ystrad unseated James Hamlyn-Williams in 1837. Jones was succeeded by another Tory, D.A. Saunders Davies who served until his death in 1857. At this point, however, the seat was occupied by David Pugh, who was  regarded as a Liberal-Conservative, and who in later life migrated to the Liberal Party.

At the 1868 general election, following a lengthy and lively campaign characterized by accusations of coercion, Edward Sartoris captured a seat for the Liberals. He was defeated in 1874 but in 1880 the Liberals again captured a seat. Following the Third Reform Act the constituency was divided into two single-member seats.

Members of Parliament

MPs 1542–1640

MPs 1640–1832

MPs 1832–1885

Election results

Elections in the 1830s

Elections in the 1840s

Jones' death caused a by-election.

Elections in the 1850s
Rice-Trevor succeeded to the peerage, becoming 4th Baron Dynevor and causing a by-election.

Davies' death caused a by-election.

Elections in the 1860s

Elections in the 1870s

Elections in the 1880s

References

Bibliography 

Robert Beatson, A Chronological Register of Both Houses of Parliament (London: Longman, Hurst, Res & Orme, 1807) 
D Brunton & D H Pennington, Members of the Long Parliament (London: George Allen & Unwin, 1954)
Cobbett's Parliamentary history of England, from the Norman Conquest in 1066 to the year 1803 (London: Thomas Hansard, 1808) 
F W S Craig, British Parliamentary Election Results 1832–1885 (2nd edition, Aldershot: Parliamentary Research Services, 1989)
 Welsh Biography Online

Historic parliamentary constituencies in South Wales
Constituencies of the Parliament of the United Kingdom established in 1542
Constituencies of the Parliament of the United Kingdom disestablished in 1885
History of Carmarthenshire
Politics of Carmarthenshire